Montana Highway 66 (MT 66) is a  state highway in the US state of Montana. It begins at an intersection with U.S. Highway 191 (US 191) in far southwestern Phillips County and runs northerly to the town of Fort Belknap in Blaine County. Approximately  of the northern end of the route is within the boundaries of the Fort Belknap Indian Reservation, running through the bulk of its territory.

Route description
It proceeds in a generally northwesterly direction, skirting the western edge of the Little Rocky Mountains. The road turns north just before crossing the county line from Phillips County into Blaine County, and subsequently enters the Fort Belknap Indian Reservation where it remains for the rest of its journey. After passing the small community of Hays on its western edge, the road continues north on a mostly straight route before turning northwest and enters Fort Belknap from the south, before a final turn to the northeast joins MT 66 to US 2 at a rest area.

History
Before receiving its current designation in 1978, MT 66 was designated as Montana Secondary Highway 376 (S-376).

Major intersections

References

External links

066